Jadwiga Barańska (born 21 October 1935) is a Polish actress and screenwriter. Jadwiga Barańska is married to Polish director Jerzy Antczak and the mother of Mikołaj Antczak, born in 1964.

Selected filmography

 Wraki (1956) as Irena
 Powrót doktora Von Kniprode (1965)
 Hrabina Cosel (1968) as Anna Constantia Hoym countess Cosel, Anna Constantia of Brockdorff
 Epilog Norymberski (1970) as an Auschwitz victim
 Kłopotliwy gość (1971) as a secretary
 Noce i dnie, Nights and Days (1975) as Barbara Niechcic
 Trędowata (1976) as countess Idalia Elzonowska
 Gniazdo wdów (Nido de viudas, 1977) as Carmen
 Noce i dnie, in English Nights and Days, (TV serial) (1977) as Barbara Niechcic
 Dama kameliowa (1995) as a screenwriter
 Chopin, Pragnienie miłości, in English Chopin: Desire for Love (2002) as Justyna Chopin, Frédéric Chopin's mother

Awards

She won the Silver Bear for Best Actress for her role in Nights and Days at the 26th Berlin International Film Festival in 1976.

References

External links
 
 Jadwiga Barańska at the Chopin-Desire for Love

1935 births
Living people
Actors from Łódź
Polish film actresses
Polish women screenwriters
Silver Bear for Best Actress winners
20th-century Polish actresses
21st-century Polish actresses
Łódź Film School alumni
Polish women writers
Polish screenwriters
Recipients of the Gold Medal for Merit to Culture – Gloria Artis
Recipients of the Gold Cross of Merit (Poland)
Polish stage actresses